Alec Morrison Astle (born 5 August 1949) is a former New Zealand cricketer who played two first-class matches for the Central Districts in the 1978–79 season. He also played for Manawatu in the Hawke Cup. He was born in Feilding. He is the father of Todd Astle.

Astle was a long-serving and influential staff member, cricket coach and Deputy Rector of Palmerston North Boys' High School, where he taught for 24 years. After that, he served as national development manager for New Zealand Cricket in Christchurch for more than 10 years. He then worked for Spark as a community sport manager. While in Christchurch he served as President of the Christchurch Metro Cricket Association, and in recognition of his service he received a Lifetime Service Award at the 2019 Sport Canterbury Awards.

He was awarded a PhD from Massey University in 2015, writing his thesis on the importance of the grassroots level of cricket. He is the co-author of Sport Development in Action: Plan, Programme and Practice (2018), a textbook on the development of sport in communities and schools. With fellow Central Districts and Manawatū player Murray Brown, Astle wrote 125 Not Out, the official history of the Manawatū Cricket Association, in 2021.

References

1949 births
Living people
People from Feilding
New Zealand cricketers
New Zealand cricket administrators
Central Districts cricketers
New Zealand schoolteachers
Massey University alumni